"Spider's Web" is the sixth single from Georgian-born singer Katie Melua's second studio album, Piece by Piece (2005). The title song was written during the lead up to the Iraq War and is said to be about finding the difference between right and wrong. The single was a bigger success in continental Europe than in Britain, where it reached number 52 on the UK Singles Chart. In the video for this single, there is a visual reference to Schindler's List.

Track listings
 "Spider's Web" (Katie Melua)
 "Spider's Web" - live version
 "Cry Baby Cry" (John Lennon, Paul McCartney)

Personnel
 Vocals: Katie Melua
 Guitars: Katie Melua, Chris Spedding, Jim Cregan
 Piano: Mike Batt
 Bass: Tim Harries
 Drums: Henry Spinetti
 Solo Trumpet: Dominic Glover
 Solo violin: Mike Darcy
 Percussion: Martin Ditchman, Chris Karan
 Orchestra: The Irish Film Orchestra
 Conductor: Mike Batt

Production
Producers: Mike Batt
Engineer: Steve Sale
Arranger: Mike Batt

Charts

References

External links
 Katie Melua web site

Katie Melua songs
2005 songs
2006 singles
Song recordings produced by Mike Batt
Songs written by Katie Melua